Caen Hill Locks are a flight of 29 locks on the Kennet and Avon Canal, between Rowde and Devizes in Wiltshire, England.

Description 
The 29 locks have a rise of 237 feet in 2 miles ( in ) or a 1 in 44 gradient. Because of the steepness of the terrain, the pounds between these locks are very short. As a result, fifteen of them have unusually large sideways-extended pounds, to store the water needed to operate them. A final six locks take the canal into Devizes. The locks take 5–6 hours to traverse in a boat.

The side pounds, the areas around them and adjoining fields to the north, are managed as nature habitat by the Canal & River Trust. Over 30,000 trees were planted in 2012–13 to mark the Diamond Jubilee of Elizabeth II.

History 
This flight was John Rennie the Elder's solution to climbing a steep hill and, in 1810, was the last part of the  route of the Kennet and Avon navigation, commenced in 1796, between Bristol and Reading, to be opened.  A brickyard had been established to the south of the site for the manufacture of bricks for the lock chambers. This remained in viable commercial use until the middle of the 20th century.  John Blackwell oversaw the locks' construction as Rennie's site agent.  Between 1801 and 1810, a tramway had provided a trade link between Foxhangers at the bottom and Devizes at the top, the remains of which can be seen in the towpath arches of the road bridges over the canal. 

In the early 19th century, between 1829 and 1843, the flight was lit by gas lights.

After the coming of the railways, the canal fell into disuse and was closed.  The last cargo through the flight was a consignment of grain conveyed from Avonmouth to Newbury in October 1948. From the 1960s there was a major clearing and rebuilding operation, culminating in a visit by Queen Elizabeth II in 1990 to open the new locks officially, although the flight had been navigable for a number of years before then.

Because a large volume of water is needed for the locks to operate, a back pump was installed at Foxhangers in 1996 capable of returning  of water per day to the top of the flight,  which is equivalent to one lockful every eleven minutes.

In 2010 British Waterways planned to install sixteen new locks gates in twelve weeks as part of its winter maintenance programme, in an attempt to reduce the amount of water lost. The exceptionally cold weather delayed work, and when the section was re-opened at Easter 2010 only twelve pairs of gates had been dealt with. The wood from the old gates was donated to Glastonbury Festival and used to build a new bridge which was named in honour of Arabella Churchill, one of the festival's founders.

Locks 
A number of the locks in the flight are named.  These include Lock 42 (Monument Lock), Lock 43 (Queen Elizabeth Lock), Lock 44 (Sir Hugh Stockwell Lock), Lock 45 (Cave Lock), Lock 46 (A. P. Herbert Lock), Lock 47 (Manifold Lock), Lock 48 (Trust Lock), Lock 49 (Maton Lock) and Lock 50 (Kennet Lock).

Restoration

See also

 Locks on the Kennet and Avon Canal

References

External links

Locks on the Kennet and Avon Canal
Canals in Wiltshire
Hills of Wiltshire
Lock flights of England
Scheduled monuments in Wiltshire